Michael Phillip Leavitt (born Fruitland, Idaho, September 11, 1960) was the eleventh Master Chief Petty Officer of the Coast Guard (MCPOCG). He assumed the position from MCPOCG Charles W. Bowen on May 21, 2010  and was relieved on May 22, 2014, by Steven W. Cantrell. Leavitt was previously serving as the Senior Enlisted Advisor to the Deputy Commandant for Operations at Coast Guard Headquarters, Washington, DC.

Personal
Master Chief Leavitt's assignments have included:

 in Seattle, Washington
Station Coos Bay, Oregon
Station Umpqua River, Oregon
 in Ketchikan, Alaska
Executive Petty Officer (XPO) of Station Siuslaw River, Oregon
Officer in Charge (OIC) of Station Maui, Hawaii
OIC of CG Station Hatteras Inlet and Station Ocracoke, North Carolina
OIC of CG Station Humboldt Bay, California
OIC of CG Station Tillamook Bay, Oregon
OIC of CG Station Cape Disappointment, Ilwaco, Washington

Master Chief Leavitt's awards include the Coast Guard Distinguished Service Medal, Coast Guard Medal, Meritorious Service Medal with an operational distinguishing device, five Coast Guard Commendation Medals with the operational distinguishing device, three Coast Guard Achievement Medals with the operational distinguishing device and numerous other individual and unit awards.  He has earned a permanent Cutterman Insignia, Surfman Badge and the Officer in Charge Afloat and Ashore devices.  He is a graduate of the Chief Petty Officers Academy Class 34.  He earned a Bachelor of Science in Business Administration (BSBA) and is pursuing a Master of Arts in Training and Education.

Awards and decorations
 Cutterman Insignia
 Surfman Badge
 Officer-in-Charge Afloat Pin
 Officer-in-Charge Ashore Pin
 Commandant Staff Badge
 Master Chief Petty Officer of the Coast Guard

8 Service Stripes.

References

Living people
Master Chief Petty Officers of the Coast Guard
1960 births
Recipients of the Coast Guard Medal
People from Fruitland, Idaho
Military personnel from Idaho